Corbin may refer to:

People
 Corbin (given name)
 Corbin (surname)
 Corbin (musician), American singer

Buildings
 Corbin Building, a historic building located at 192 Broadway in New York, US
 Corbin Cabin, a log structure in Shenandoah National Park, US
 Corbin Covered Bridge, a covered bridge in New Hampshire, US
 Corbin, a variant of Corbenic, the Grail castle in Arthurian literature

Places

Canada
 Corbin, British Columbia, a ghost town
 Corbin, Burin Peninsula, Newfoundland and Labrador, a settlement
 Corbin, Fortune Bay, Newfoundland and Labrador, a settlement

United States
 Corbin, Georgia, an unincorporated community
 Corbin, Kansas, a community in Sumner County
 Corbin, Kentucky, a city located in Whitley and Knox Counties
 Corbin, Missouri, a ghost town
 Corbin, Montana, an unincorporated community and ghost town in Jefferson County
 Corbin, Virginia, an unincorporated community in Caroline County
 Corbin, West Virginia, an unincorporated community in Wood County
 Corbin City, New Jersey, a city in Atlantic County, New Jersey
 North Corbin, Kentucky, a census-designated place in Knox and Laurel counties, Kentucky

Other uses
 4008 Corbin, a main-belt asteroid discovered in 1977 
 bec de corbin, a type of pole weapon popular in medieval Europe
 Corbin (automobile), an early twentieth century automobile
 Corbin (castle), a castle in Arthurian fantasy, also called Corbenic
 Corbin Creek Falls, a waterfall in North Carolina, United States
 Corbin Motors, a 1990s manufacturer of sporty electric and hybrid vehicles, now Myers EV
 Corbin Park, a private game preserve in New Hampshire

See also

 Grady v. Corbin, a decision by the United States Supreme Court
 Corbin/Hanner, a singing duo
 Corbin Fisher, an American film studio with a focus in gay pornography
 Corben, a surname
 Corbyn (name), an Anglicised version of Corbin used as both a given name and surname
 Corbins, a municipality in Spain
 Saint Corbinian, a Frankish bishop